Unai Vencedor Paris (born 15 November 2000) is a Spanish professional footballer who plays as a midfielder for Athletic Bilbao.

Club career
Born in Bilbao, Biscay, Basque Country, Vencedor joined Athletic Bilbao's Lezama academy in 2017, from Santutxu FC. In June of the following year, after finishing his formation, he moved straight into the reserve squad for the pre-season (skipping the usual step to the farm team), and made his senior debut on 29 September by starting in a 2–1 Segunda División B away loss against Real Oviedo Vetusta.

He scored his first senior goal on 15 December 2018, netting his team's second in a 3–2 home win against CD Calahorra. Six days later, he renewed his contract with the Lions until 2023.

Vencedor made his first team – and La Liga – debut on 16 February 2020, starting in a 1–0 home defeat to CA Osasuna. He did not feature again that season and was reported to have requested a loan move to continue his development, but was told he would be in contention for a place during the 2020–21 campaign. He had to wait until the end of November 2020 before making another start against Real Betis, but was selected regularly from then on.

Having established himself in the squad (including winning the Supercopa de España with victories over Real Madrid then FC Barcelona), in February 2021 Vencedor agreed a new contract with Athletic running to the summer of 2025, with a €40 million buyout clause.

International career

Vencedor is a youth international for Spain, having represented the under-19s in 2019 and the under-21s in 2021.

Career statistics

Club

Honours
Athletic Bilbao
Supercopa de España: 2020–21
Copa del Rey runner-up: 2019–20, 2020–21

References

External links

 
 
 
 
 
 

2000 births
Living people
Spanish footballers
Footballers from Bilbao
Association football midfielders
La Liga players
Segunda División B players
Santutxu FC players
Bilbao Athletic footballers
Athletic Bilbao footballers
Spain youth international footballers
Spain under-21 international footballers